The Pakistan Council of Scientific & Industrial Research (PCSIR) is a government-owned science and industrialisation research organisation which mainly focuses on the development of industrial research.

History 
Initially established as Pakistan Department of Research in 1951, PCSIR was reformulated in its current form in 1953. The PCSIR was established in Karachi by Prof. Dr. Salimuzzaman Siddiqui in 1953 for the development of scientific and technical Research and Development and to provide infrastructure for industrial development in Pakistan. The organisation was founded under the Societies Act to promote the cause of Science and Technology in the country. Since 1973, it has functioned under the Act of Parliament. The organisation remained under the control of Pakistan's Ministry of Science and Technology until given autonomy in 1984.

Units 
As of today, the PCSIR has several geographically dispersed research centres. including four regional offices in each of the provincial capitals, with the head office in Islamabad. There are eleven laboratories and units and five HRD centres established throughout the country, headed by director generals or directors who directly report to the chairman. The chairman of PCSIR is appointed by the Government of Pakistan. There are 150 officers and technical staff in the head office, including seven directors working in different divisions and departments. There are 681 scientists, engineers, and technologists working in different laboratories, of whom eighty have Ph.D. degrees and others have M.Sc./MS/M.Phil./B.E. degrees in multidisciplinary fields. They are supported by 1,656 technical and skilled staff and 178 administrative staff.

Testing for consumer safety
In January 2017, the council conducted tests on 16 brands of packaged milk in the interest of public safety and found that only 6 of 16 brands were safe for public consumption. This report was presented to the National Assembly of Pakistan.

See also 
 Higher Education Commission of Pakistan
 Pakistan Academy of Sciences
 Pakistan Educational Research Network

References

External links
 Pakistan Council of Scientific and Industrial Research - official website
 The Official Website of PCSIR Karachi Laboratories Complex
 The Official website of PCSIR Lahore Laboratories
 The Official website of PCSIR Fuel Research Centre Karachi

Organizations established in 1953
Science and technology think tanks
Science and technology in Pakistan
Scientific organisations based in Pakistan
Pakistan federal departments and agencies
1953 establishments in Pakistan
Government agencies established in 1953